European Australians are citizens or residents of Australia whose ancestry originates from the peoples of Europe. They form the largest panethnic group in the country. At the 2021 census, the number of ancestry responses categorised within European ancestral groups as a proportion of the total population amounted to at least 57.2% (46% North-West European and 11.2% Southern and Eastern European). It is impossible to quantify the precise proportion of the population with European ancestry. For instance, many census recipients nominated two European ancestries, tending towards an overcount. Conversely, 29.9% of census recipients nominated "Australian" ancestry (categorised within the Oceanian ancestry group although the Australian Bureau of Statistics has stated that most of them are likely to have Anglo-Celtic or European ancestry), tending towards an undercount.

Since the early 19th century, people of European descent have formed the majority of the population in Australia. Historically, European immigrants had great influence over Australian culture and society, which resulted in the perception of Australia as a European-derived country.

The majority of European Australians are of British Isles – English, Irish, Scottish, or Welsh – ancestral origin. While not an official ancestral classification, they are often referred to as Anglo-Celtic Australians. Other significant ancestries include Italian, German, Greek, Dutch, European New Zealanders, Polish, Maltese, and Scandinavian.

Classification
The Australian Bureau of Statistics and Australian Census does not collect data based on race. Instead, it collects information on distinct ancestries, of which census respondents can select up to two. For the purposes of aggregating data, the Australian Bureau of Statistics in its Australian Standard Classification of Cultural and Ethnic Groups (ASCCEG) has grouped certain ancestries into certain categories, including the following two broad European groupings:
 North-West European Australians, including Austrian Australians, Belgian Australians, Danish Australians, Dutch Australians, English Australians, Finnish Australians, French Australians, German Australians, Icelandic Australians, Irish Australians, Norwegian Australians, Scottish Australians, Swedish Australians and Welsh Australians
 Southern and Eastern European Australians, including Albanian Australians, Belarusian Australians, Bosnian Australians, Bulgarian Australians, Croatian Australians, Cypriot Australians, Czech Australians, Estonian Australians, Greek Australians, Hungarian Australians, Italian Australians, Latvian Australians, Lithuanian Australians, Macedonian Australians, Maltese Australians, Montenegrin Australians, Polish Australians, Portuguese Australians, Romanian Australians, Russian Australians, Serbian Australians, Slovak Australians, Slovene Australians, Spanish Australians and Ukrainian Australians

While officially part of the North-West European classification, Australians of English, Irish, Scottish, Welsh or Cornish ancestral origins are often informally referred to as Anglo-Celtic Australians.

The Australian Bureau of Statistics has stated that most people nominating "Australian" ancestry have at least partial Anglo-Celtic European ancestry, although they are officially categorised as part of the Oceanian group.

History

Early sightings by Europeans

The first records of European mariners sailing into 'Australian' waters occurs around 1606, and includes their observations of the land known as Terra Australis Incognita (unknown southern land). The first ship and crew to chart the Australian coast and meet with Aboriginal people was the Duyfken captained by Dutchman, Willem Janszoon.

Between 1606 and 1770, an estimated 54 European ships from a range of nations made contact. Many of these were merchant ships from the Dutch East Indies Company and included the ships of Abel Tasman. Tasman charted parts of the north, west and south coasts of Australia which was then known as New Holland.

Seebaer van Nieuwelant (born 27 July 1623), son of Willemtgen and Willem Janszoon, was born south of Dirk Hartog Island, in present-day Western Australia. Nieuwelant was the First white child born in Australia. 

In 1770, Englishman Lieutenant James Cook charted the Australian east coast in his ship HM Barque Endeavour. Cook wrote that he claimed the east coast for King George III of Great Britain on 22 August 1770 when standing on Possession Island off the west coast of Cape York Peninsula, naming eastern Australia "New South Wales'. The coast of Australia, featuring Tasmania as a separate island, was mapped in detail by the English mariners and navigators Bass and Flinders, and the French mariner, Baudin. A nearly completed map of the coastline was published by Flinders in 1814.

This period of European exploration is reflected in the names of landmarks such as the Torres Strait, Arnhem Land, Dampier Sound, Tasmania, the Furneaux Islands, Cape Frecinyet and La Perouse. French expeditions between 1790 and the 1830s, led by D'Entrecasteaux, Baudin, and Furneaux, were recorded by the naturalists Labillardière and Péron.

First settlement by Europeans

The British Crown Colony of New South Wales started with the establishment of a settlement at Sydney Cove by Captain Arthur Phillip on 26 January 1788. This date later became Australia's national day, Australia Day. These land masses included the current islands of New Zealand, which was administered as part of New South Wales until it became a separate colony in 1841. Van Diemen's Land, now known as Tasmania, was first settled in 1803.

British and Irish settlers
The first European Australians came from United Kingdom and Ireland.

The First white child born in New South Wales was Rebecca Small (22 September 1789 – 30 January 1883), was born in Port Jackson, the eldest daughter of John Small a boatswain in the First Fleet which arrived at Botany Bay in January 1788.

The First white child born in Victoria was William James Hobart Thorne (25 November 1803 – 2 July 1872) was born at Port Phillip, in what was still part of New South Wales but became Victoria

Other British settlements followed, at various points around the continent, most of them unsuccessful. In 1824, a penal colony was established near the mouth of the Brisbane River (the basis of the later colony of Queensland). In 1826, a British military camp was established in Western Australia at King George Sound, to discourage French colonisation. (The camp formed the basis of the later town of Albany.) In 1829, the Swan River Colony and its capital of Perth were founded on the west coast proper and also assumed control of King George Sound. Initially a free colony, Western Australia later accepted British convicts, because of an acute labour shortage.

The British Colonial Office in 1835 issued the Proclamation of Governor Bourke, implementing the legal doctrine of terra nullius upon which British settlement was based, reinforcing the notion that the land belonged to no one prior to the British Crown taking possession of it and quashing earlier treaties with Aboriginal peoples, such as that signed by John Batman. Its publication meant that from then, all people found occupying land without the authority of the government would be considered illegal trespassers.

Separate colonies were created from parts of New South Wales: South Australia in 1836, New Zealand in 1840, Victoria in 1851, and Queensland in 1859. The Northern Territory was founded in 1863 as part of South Australia. The transportation of convicts to Australia was phased out between 1840 and 1868.

The European population grew from 0.3 percent of the population of the continent at 1800 to 58.6 percent at 1850.
In 1868, the population of European Australians was 1,539,552.

Massive areas of land were cleared for agriculture and various other purposes, in addition to the obvious impacts this early clearing of land had on the ecology of particular regions, it severely affected indigenous Australians, by reducing the resources they relied on for food, shelter and other essentials. This progressively forced them into smaller areas and reduced their numbers as the majority died of newly introduced diseases and lack of resources. Indigenous resistance against the settlers was widespread, and prolonged fighting between 1788 and the 1930s led to the deaths of at least 20,000 Indigenous people and between 2,000 and 2,500 Europeans.

Irish formed about 25 per cent of the European Australian population in the nineteenth century. Germans formed the largest non-British community for most of the 19th century.

In 1971 nine out of the top ten birthplace groups were from European countries and accounted for 77.2% of all people born overseas. 
People from the United Kingdom still form the largest group. However, their number as a proportion of the total overseas-born population has declined, falling from 40.6% (1,046,356) in 1971 to 17.7% (1,078,064) in 2016.

After World War II

Following World War II, the Australian government instigated a massive program of European immigration. After narrowly preventing a Japanese invasion  and suffering attacks on Australian soil for the first time, it was seen that the country must "populate or perish".  Prior to WWII, Australia had viewed itself as largely of British and Irish ancestry but after WWII the success of the United States and the reason for its success, that is largely the creation of a European diaspora, could not be ignored by Australia.  Immigration brought traditional migrants from the United Kingdom along with, for the first time, large numbers of southern and central Europeans, as well as Eastern European Australians. A booming Australian economy stood in sharp contrast to war-ravaged Europe, and newly arrived migrants found employment in government-assisted programs such as the Snowy Mountains Scheme. Two million immigrants arrived between 1948 and 1975, many from Robert Menzies' newly founded Liberal Party of Australia dominated much of the immediate post-war era, defeating the Australian Labor Party government of Ben Chifley in 1949. Menzies oversaw the post-war expansion and became the country's longest-serving leader. Manufacturing industry, previously playing a minor part in an economy dominated by primary production, greatly expanded. Since the 1970s and the abolition of the White Australia policy from Asia and other parts of the world, Australia's demography, culture and image of itself has been radically transformed.

In 1987, the vast majority of European Australians were descendants either of Anglo-Irish-Scots who arrived after 1850, or of Greeks, Italians, Hungarians, South Slavs, Poles and Germans who emigrated after 1945.

Demographics
Notably, Australia does not collect statistics on the racial origins of its residents, instead collecting data at each five-yearly census on distinct ancestries, of which each census respondent may choose up to two. At the 2021 census, the number of ancestry responses categorised within European ancestral groups as a proportion of the total population amounted to 57.2% (including 46% North-West European and 11.2% Southern and Eastern European). It is impossible to quantify the precise proportion of the population with European ancestry. For instance, many census recipients nominated two European ancestries, tending towards an overcount. Conversely, 29.9% of census recipients nominated "Australian" ancestry (categorised within the Oceanian ancestry group although the Australian Bureau of Statistics has stated that most of them are likely to have at least partial Anglo-Celtic European ancestry), tending towards an undercount.

At the 2021 census, the most commonly nominated European ancestries were as set out in the following table.

Historical demographics

Australia enumerated its population by race between 1911 and 1966, by racial-origin in 1971 and 1976, and by self-declared ancestry since 1986. From 1986 onwards, only estimates can be obtained from ancestry. The 1991 and 1996 census did not include a question on ancestry.

The following table shows the proportion of Australian residents nominating European race or ancestry at various points in history.

The following table shows the numbers of Australians claiming various European ancestries at selected historical intervals.

The following table shows the proportions of European-born and British Isles-born residents at various points in history.

Political involvement

Colonial period
As the earliest colonists of Australia, settlers from England and their descendants often held positions of power and made or helped make laws often because many had been involved in government back in England. In the original six separate British self-governing colonies of Queensland, New South Wales, Victoria, Tasmania, South Australia, and Western Australia agreed to unite and form the Commonwealth of Australia, establishing a system of federalism in Australia.

National founders

The lineage of most of the national founders was British (especially English) such as:
 Sir Henry Parkes is often regarded as the "Father of Federation" in Australia. During the late 19th century, he was the strongest proponent for a federation of Australian territories. Parkes died before Australia federated, and was never able to see his plan come to fruition. 
Various other founders of Australia have also been unofficially recognised: 
 Captain James Cook, the Englishman who claimed Australia
 Captain Arthur Phillip (Englishman), was the first governor of New South Wales and founder of the first colony
 Sir Edmund Barton (English parents), the first Australian Prime Minister. 
 Scotsman Lachlan Macquarie is considered by historians to have had a crucial influence on the transition of New South Wales from a penal colony to a free settlement and therefore to have played a major role in the shaping of Australian society in the early nineteenth century. An inscription on his tomb on the Isle of Mull, Scotland describes him as "The Father of Australia".

Culture

European-Australian culture is integral to the culture of Australia. The culture of Australia is essentially a Western culture influenced by the unique geography of the Australian continent, the diverse input of Aboriginal, Torres Strait Islander and other Oceanian people, the British colonisation of Australia that began in 1788, and the various waves of multi-ethnic migration that followed. As the English were always the largest element among the settlers, their cultural influence was naturally greater than that of the Irish, Welsh or Scots. Evidence of a significant Anglo-Celtic heritage includes the predominance of the English language, the common law, the Westminster system of government, Christianity (Anglicanism) as the once dominant religion, and the popularity of sports such as cricket and rugby; all of which are part of the heritage that has shaped modern Australia. Australian culture has diverged significantly since British settlement.

Several states and territories had their origins as penal colonies, with the first British convicts arriving at Sydney Cove in 1788. Stories of outlaws like the bushranger Ned Kelly have endured in Australian music, cinema and literature. The Australian gold rushes from the 1850s brought wealth as well as new social tensions to Australia, including the miners' Eureka Stockade rebellion. The colonies established elected parliaments and rights for workers and women before most other Western nations.

Language

Australian English is a major variety of the English language and is used throughout Australia. Although English has no official status in the Constitution, Australian English is the country's de facto official language and is the first language of the majority of the population.

Australian English began to diverge from British English after the founding of the colony of New South Wales in 1788 and was recognised as being different from British English by 1820. It arose from the intermingling of early settlers from a great variety of mutually intelligible dialectal regions of the British Isles and quickly developed into a distinct variety of English.
Australian English differs from other varieties of English in vocabulary, accent, pronunciation, register, grammar and spelling.

The earliest form of Australian English was first spoken by the children of the colonists born into the colony of New South Wales. This first generation of children created a new dialect that was to become the language of the nation. The Australian-born children in the new colony were exposed to a wide range of dialects from all over the British Isles, in particular from Ireland and South East England.

The native-born children of the colony created the new dialect from the speech they heard around them, and with it expressed mateship. Even when new settlers arrived, this new dialect was strong enough to blunt other patterns of speech.

A quarter of the convicts were Irish. Many had been arrested in Ireland, and some in Great Britain. Many, if not most, of the Irish convicts spoke either no English at all, or spoke it poorly and rarely. There were other significant populations of convicts from non-English speaking part of Britain, such as the Scottish Highlands and Wales.

The most commonly spoken European languages other than English in Australia are Italian, Greek and German.

Music
Another area of cultural influence are Australian Patriotic songs:
"Advance Australia Fair" is the national anthem of Australia - Created by the Scottish-born composer Peter Dodds McCormick, the song was first performed in 1878, and was sung in Australia as a patriotic song. It replaced "God Save the Queen". It did not gain its status as the official anthem until 1984, following a plebiscite to choose the national song in 1977.
"Waltzing Matilda"  - Australia's most widely known bush ballad, and has been described as the country's "unofficial national anthem". Scottish-Australian poet Banjo Paterson wrote the words to "Waltzing Matilda" in January 1895 while staying at Dagworth Station, a sheep and cattle station near Winton in western Queensland owned by the Macpherson family. The words were written to a tune played on a zither or autoharp by 31‑year‑old Christina Macpherson, one of the family members at the station.
"The Song of Australia" - An English-born poet Caroline Carleton wrote the lyrics in 1859 for a competition sponsored by the Gawler Institute.  The music for the song was composed by the German-born Carl Linger (1810-1862).

Architecture

The Sydney Opera House was formally opened on 20 October 1973, by Queen Elizabeth II. After a gestation beginning with Utzon's 1957 selection as winner of an international design competition. The government of New South Wales, led by the premier, Joseph Cahill, authorised work to begin in 1958 with Utzon directing construction. The government's decision to build Utzon's design is often overshadowed by circumstances that followed, including cost and scheduling overruns as well as the architect's ultimate resignation.

Australia has three architectural listings on UNESCO's World Heritage list: Australian Convict Sites (comprising a collection of separate sites around Australia, including Hyde Park Barracks in Sydney, Port Arthur in Tasmania, and Fremantle Prison in Western Australia); the Sydney Opera House; and the Royal Exhibition Building in Melbourne. Contemporary Australian architecture includes a number of other iconic structures, including the Harbour Bridge in Sydney and Parliament House, Canberra. Significant architects who have worked in Australia include Governor Lachlan Macquarie's colonial architect, Francis Greenway; the ecclesiastical architect William Wardell; the designer of Canberra's layout, Walter Burley Griffin; the modernist Harry Seidler; and Jørn Utzon, designer of the Sydney Opera House. The National Trust of Australia is a non-governmental organisation charged with protecting Australia's built heritage.

Prime Ministers 

, there have been 31 Prime Ministers of Australia. The ancestors of all these Prime Ministers have all been European and Anglo-Celtic (English, Scottish, Northern Irish, Welsh, or Irish). Some ancestors of four Prime Minister's did not emigrate from Britain or Ireland: some of the ancestors of Chris Watson were German (his father was German Chilean), some of the ancestors of Malcolm Fraser were European Jews, some of Tony Abbott's ancestors were Dutch migrants (one of his grandparents), and Anthony Albanese's ancestors on his father's side were Italians.

1st Edmund Barton (English)
2nd Alfred Deakin (English, Welsh)
3rd Chris Watson (German, English)
4th George Reid (Scottish)
5th Andrew Fisher (Scottish)
6th Joseph Cook (English, Irish)
7th Billy Hughes (Welsh)
8th Stanley Bruce (Ulster Scottish, Irish)
9th James Scullin (Irish)
10th Joseph Lyons (Irish)
11th Earle Page (English, Scottish)
12th Robert Menzies (Scottish, Cornish)
13th Arthur Fadden (Irish, Northern Irish)
14th John Curtin (Irish)
15th Frank Forde (Irish)

16th Ben Chifley (Irish)
17th Harold Holt (English, Irish, German)
18th John McEwen (Ulster Scottish, English, Irish)
19th John Gorton (English, Irish, German)
20th William McMahon (Irish, English)
21st Gough Whitlam (English, Scottish)
22nd Malcolm Fraser (Scottish, English-Jewish)
23rd Bob Hawke (Cornish)
24th Paul Keating (Irish, English)
25th John Howard (English, Scottish, Irish)
26th Kevin Rudd (English, Irish)
27th Julia Gillard (English, Irish, Welsh, Scottish)
28th Tony Abbott (English, Welsh, Dutch)
29th Malcolm Turnbull (English, Scottish)
30th Scott Morrison (Scottish, English, Irish)
31st Anthony Albanese (Irish, Italian)

Breakdown 

The following is a breakdown of the ethnic origins of Australians based on a 2018 study that used data from the 2016 census.

See also 
 Demographics of Australia
 Europeans in Oceania
 First white child in Australia
 European Americans
 European Canadians
 European New Zealanders
 European diaspora
 Immigration to Australia
 White Australia policy
 White demographic decline
 Australians
 White people

Notes

References